Edward George Hoffman (October 1, 1877 – February 11, 1931) was a Democratic National Committee member from Indiana from 1916 to 1920.

Biography
He died on February 11, 1931, when he fell from his horse.

References

Indiana Democrats
1877 births
1931 deaths
Deaths by horse-riding accident in the United States